The 1978/79 NTFL season was the 58th season of the Northern Territory Football League (NTFL).

St Marys have won there 10th premiership title while defeating the Nightcliff Tigers in the grand final by 31 points.

Grand Final

References

Northern Territory Football League seasons
NTFL